

A universal indicator is a pH indicator made of a solution of several compounds that exhibits several smooth colour changes over a wide range pH values to indicate the acidity or alkalinity of solutions. Although there are several commercially available universal pH indicators, most are a variation of a formula patented by Yamada in 1933. Details of this patent can be found in Chemical Abstracts. Experiments with Yamada's universal indicator are also described in the Journal of Chemical Education.

A universal indicator is usually composed of water, 1-propanol, phenolphthalein, sodium hydroxide, methyl red, bromothymol blue, sodium bisulfite, and thymol blue. The colours that indicate the pH of a solution, after adding a universal indicator, are 

The colours from yellow to red indicate an acidic solution, colours blue to violet indicate an alkaline solution and a green colour indicates that a solution is neutral.

Wide-range pH test papers with distinct colours for each pH from 1 to 14 are also available. Colour matching charts are supplied with the specific test strips purchased.

Types 

A universal indicator is collectively a mixture of indicators which show a colour change in a solution, which interprets how acidic or basic a solution is. A universal indicator can be in paper form or present in a form of a solution.
 Paper form: It is a strip of coloured paper which changes colour to red if the solution is acidic and to blue, if the solution is basic. The strip can be placed directly onto a surface of a wet substance or few drops of the solution can be dropped onto the universal indicator using dropping equipment. If the test solution is of a dark colour, it is preferable to use a paper universal indicator.
 Solution: The main components of a universal indicator, in the form of a solution, are thymol blue, methyl red, bromothymol blue, and phenolphthalein. This mixture is important because each component loses or gains protons depending upon the acidity or alkalinity of the solution being tested. It is beneficial to use this type of universal indicator in a colourless solution. This will increase the accuracy level of indication.

See also
Litmus
pH indicator

References

 PH indicators